Gressonney may refer to two villages and communes in the Aosta Valley region of Italy:

Gressoney-La-Trinité
Gressoney-Saint-Jean
Gressoney (AO), the single commune into which they were united during the years 1928–46

See also 
 Gresson